Rajinder Gupta is an Indian businessman. Gupta is Chairman of Trident Group, a business conglomerate headquartered in Ludhiana, Punjab, and Chairman of the Corporate Advisory Board of Trident Limited.

In 2007, Gupta received the Padma Shri Award from the then President of India in recognition of distinguished service in the field of Trade and Industry.

Recently he has been appointed as Chairman of, Board of Governors, Punjab Engineering College, Chandigarh.

He is also a representative of Trade, Industry & Commerce on the Board of Governors of Punjab Bureau of Investment Promotion and is Chairman of Advisory Council of Punjab, Haryana, Chandigarh & Himachal Pradesh of Federation of Indian Chambers of Commerce & Industry (FICCI). He is the President of Punjab Cricket Association since September 2017.

Career
In 1985, Gupta bought his way into the business of chemicals and fertilizers with an investment of INR 6.5 crore.

Gupta is also the Vice Chairman of CII Punjab State Council for 2006–07, Director of Punjab Technical University and Punjab State Board of Technical Education and Industrial Training.

References

Living people
Businesspeople from Ludhiana
Recipients of the Padma Shri in trade and industry
Indian chairpersons of corporations
20th-century Indian businesspeople
Year of birth missing (living people)